The 2011–12 Allen Americans season was the third season of the Central Hockey League (CHL) franchise in Allen, Texas.

Off-season

Regular season

Conference standings

Awards and records

Awards

Milestones

Transactions
The Americans have been involved in the following transactions during the 2011–12 season.

Trades

Free agents acquired

Free agents lost

Players re-signed

Roster
Updated December 4, 2011.

|}

See also
 2011–12 CHL season

References

External links

Allen Americans
Allen Americans